Sofija Novoselić (born January 18, 1990) is a Croatian alpine skier, member of the Croatian Alpine Ski Team. Her strongest discipline is slalom.

Novoselić was born in Zagreb, at the time in SR Croatia, SFR Yugoslavia. She debuted in Zagreb in 2006. Her best result so far in a FIS race was 10th place in slalom. In FIS Alpine World Ski Championships 2007 she won 27th place in slalom.

External links
 Sofija Novoselić on FIS

1990 births
Croatian female alpine skiers
Sportspeople from Zagreb
Living people
Alpine skiers at the 2010 Winter Olympics
Olympic alpine skiers of Croatia
Alpine skiers at the 2014 Winter Olympics
21st-century Croatian women